Mary Alice Tieche Smith (1918–1987) was the wife of former Governor of West Virginia, Hulett C. Smith and served as that state's First Lady from 1965-1969.  She was born June 25, 1918 at Beckley, West Virginia.  She attended Arlington Hall School in Washington, D.C. and Ward Belmont Junior College in Nashville, Tennessee.  She married Hulett C. Smith in 1942.  As first lady, she supervised a major renovation of the West Virginia Governor's Mansion and helped develop a brochure depicting the changes.  She also promoted civic causes such as public health issues and Head Start early education programs.  After leaving office, the Smiths returned to Beckley, where she died April 13, 1987.

References

1918 births
1987 deaths
People from Beckley, West Virginia
First Ladies and Gentlemen of West Virginia
20th-century American women